The Wickerman Festival was an annual music festival held near Auchencairn in Dumfries and Galloway, Scotland. Dubbed "Scotland's Alternative Music festival", its motto was "The Wickerman Festival – it's better than it needs to be!"

It began in 2001 when Sid Ambrose, later the festival's artistic director, hit upon the idea of a local counterculture-based, family-friendly event whilst working with the Stewartry Music Initiative. This was due in large part to the surrounding area featuring various locations used in the cult British horror film The Wicker Man (1973), starring Christopher Lee and Edward Woodward.

Musically and creatively, the festival was likened to a smaller version of Glastonbury, with a widely eclectic mix of music to suit everyone. It had several performance spaces including the Summerisle main stage, the Axis Sound System reggae sound system tent, the Acoustic Village, a stage for punk/ska/northern soul called the Scooter Tent, the Solus Tent for new Scottish bands and several dance tents. It additionally featured a children's area, workshops, a beer tent, craft spaces, a cinema and much more.

The festival  would climax on the  Saturday at midnight with the burning of a giant  wicker man, built by local craftsmen Trevor Leat and Alex Rigg. The designs for these became ever more elaborate and inventive in successive years.

The 2015 festival, which had a capacity of 18,000, took place six months after the unexpected death of Jamie Gilroy, and his widow and daughter later announced it would take a hiatus for the following year. However, after failure to find a third-party promoter, in November 2016 they took the decision to end the festival altogether.

2015 festival

2014 festival

2013 festival
The 2013 festival was held on 26 and 27 July, and featured artists such as Primal Scream, Chic, Amy MacDonald and Dexys on the main Summerisle stage. Dance DJs included Matt Hinde, James Ryan and Luke Stanger. The Scooter Tent featured Stiff Little Fingers and The Rezillos. Alcoholic beverages were served from both a converted ice cream van named Mr Bevvy and a twenty foot fibre glass likeness of the head of English comedian Jimmy Carr called the Jimmy Barr. Two young English barmen name Dick and Dave proved very popular.

2012 festival
The 2012 festival was held on 20 and 21 July, and featured artists such as The Scissor Sisters, Texas, The View, Newton Faulkner, The Levellers, Matt Hinde and Kassidy.

2011 festival
In 2011, artists included Diddums, James, Feeder, The Coral, Echo & The Bunnymen, Noisettes, The Pigeon Detectives, The Hoosiers, Craig Charles Funk and Soul Club (DJ Set), Matt Hinde (DJ Set), The Damned, From The Jam and Reverieme.

2010 festival
The 2010 event saw Ocean Colour Scene play the Saturday night headline slot before the ceremonial and spectacular burning of the Wickerman, the 808 State DJ's then rounded off the main stage proceedings. On Friday night the Summerisle stage hosted Teenage Fanclub before a storming set from headliners The Charlatans. DJ Matt Hinde in the Skiddle dance tent once again.

Buzzcocks, The Futureheads, Tony Christie, Goldie Lookin' Chain, The Undertones, The Go! Team, Withered Hand, The Saw Doctors, Fenech Soler, Erland and the Carnival, Sons & Daughters, The Grass Mountain Hobos, Back To The Planet, Monkeyrush, The Sex Pistols Experience, Ed Tudor-Pole, The Amphetameanies & Root System all also appeared on various stages over the weekend.

2009 festival
The 2009 line up included The Human League headlining on the Friday night, The Zutons closed the Saturday night after Candi Staton. The Dance Tent saw the Hot Chip DJs, Danny Rampling and Matt Hinde on the decks. The Magic Numbers, Billy Bragg, Idlewild, Dreadzone, Zion Train, Utah Saints, The Dickies, Bad Manners, Kid British and Pearl and the Puppets all appeared over the weekend.

2008 festival
Artists that played Wickerman 2008 included KT Tunstall, Gary Numan, Matt Hinde (DJ Set), Broken Records, Beatnic Prestige, The Foxes, Dub Pistols, The Cuban Brothers, Hugh Cornwell (ex-Stranglers frontman), Neville Staple, Dream Machine, Monkish, Attic Lights, The Hacienda Tour (featuring Shaun Ryder, Bez, and DJ Graeme Park), X-Press2, Annie Nightingale and Headphone Disco.

2007 festival
Artists that performed in 2007 included Fun Lovin' Criminals, The Proclaimers, Hayseed Dixie, The Orb, DJ Matt Hinde, The Negatives, The Targets, The Common Empire, Cider Spiders, Modus, Darkwater, The Call, The Beat, The Rezillos, The Peatbog Faeries, The Yardbirds, Eat Static, Jah Wobble, Neck, Uniting The Elements, I Am Kloot, Skaville UK, Popup, The Low Miffs, The Kazoo Funk Orchestra, Black Affair, Miss The Occupier, Only Joe Kane, Saint Jude's Infirmary, Miss King and the Cougars, John Langhan, Ardent John, Taiko Drummers, Andi Neate, Sally Campbell, Jam Squad!, Andy Lang & the Well, The Stompswampers, Sixpeopleaway, Copy Haho, Our Lunar Activities, How to Swim, Frightened Rabbit, Clean George IV, Dance Lazarus Dance!, and Y'all Is Fantasy Island.

Discussing his first ever Wickerman, in 2007, XFM Scotland's Jim Gellatly said: "The most family friendly festival I've been to, and a brilliant weekend. If you're ever tempted to take kids to Glastonbury, at least try out Wickerman first.  A pretty successful jaunt all round, and I'm already looking forward to next year."

In November 2007, Wickerman won the category of 'Best Grass Roots Festival' at the UK Festival Awards.  The only other Scottish festival to win was the John Lennon Festival in Durness.

2006 festival
The line up included The Alarm, New Model Army, The Aliens, Sandi Thom, System 7, Matt Hinde (DJ Set) and the Sensational Alex Harvey Band.

2005 festival
The 2005 festival was headlined by The Stranglers, Dreadzone, Alabama 3, Arthur Brown, Neville Staples, and Space Ritual.

2004 festival
2004 included Aereogramme, Buzzcocks, The Selector, Spiritualized, AntiProduct and The Levellers.

2003 festival
Ozric Tentacles, The Damned, The Beat, Dead Men Walking, UK Subs, Bad Manners & Nine Below Zero

2002 festival
Stiff Little Fingers, Spear of Destiny, UK Subs

2001 festival
Stiff Little Fingers, Spear of Destiny

Awards
It was nominated for two festival awards:
 Best Cult Following 2005
 Best Grassroots Festival 2006

Charities
The Wickerman Festival supported these charities:
Tusk Trust
The First Base Agency
Crew 2000
Via Rerrick Events, the festival's charitable arm, it raised funds for the education of young Tanzanian orphan James Okeyo through activities in the children’s area.

References

External links

The Wickerman Festival Official Site at the Wayback Machine
Official Facebook page
Official Twitter account
Official Vimeo channel
The Wickerman Festival news and reviews at Skiddle
The Wickerman Festival 2015 Official Film

Tourist attractions in Dumfries and Galloway
Music festivals in Scotland
Music festivals established in 2002
2002 establishments in Scotland
Electronic music festivals in the United Kingdom
Music festivals disestablished in 2016
2016 disestablishments in Scotland